The Manitoba & Northwestern Hockey Association was an early senior-level men's amateur ice hockey league, founded in 1903, and played one season, 1903-1904 before joining the Manitoba Hockey Association. It operated in the provinces of Manitoba and Ontario of Canada, and was an important league in the early development of ice hockey in Canada.

Teams 
 Brandon Wheat City Hockey Club
 Portage la Prairie Plains
 Rat Portage Thistles

1903-04 Season 

League Leaders

Stanley Cup Challenge 
In March 1903, the Rat Portage Thistles would challenge the Ottawa Senators in a best-of-three series in Ottawa. The Thistles were younger and quicker than Ottawa; only one player on the Thistles was over the age of 20. However, poor soft ice conditions in Ottawa played a major factor as Ottawa swept the series with scores of 6–2 and 4–2.

References 
 https://web.archive.org/web/20150212014941/http://hobokin.net/kenorastats1.html

Defunct ice hockey leagues in Manitoba
Defunct ice hockey leagues in Ontario